Edward Patrick "Joe" Moroney (26 April 1890 – 22 March 1956) was an Australian rules footballer who played with St Kilda in the Victorian Football League (VFL).

Family
The son of Michael Moroney, and Margaret Moroney, née Wall, Edward Patrick Moroney was born at Goroke, Victoria on 26 April 1890.

Football

St Kilda (VFL)
He made his VFL debut for St Kilda, against Richmond, at Punt Road, on 31 July 1909.

Prahran (VFA)
He transferred to Prahran in 1910.

Death
He died on 22 March 1956 "after a long illness".

Notes

References

External links 
 
 
 Joe Moroney, at The VFA Project.

1890 births
1956 deaths
Australian rules footballers from Victoria (Australia)
St Kilda Football Club players
Prahran Football Club players
Prahran Football Club coaches